The Women's 400 metres Hurdles at the 1984 Summer Olympics in Los Angeles, California, United States, had an entry list of 26 competitors, with four qualifying heats (26 runners) and two semifinals (16) before the final (8) took place on August 8, 1984. The event made its Olympic debut at these games.

Medalists

Abbreviations

Final

Semi-finals

Qualifying heats

See also
 1982 Women's European Championships 400m Hurdles (Athens)
 1983 Women's World Championships 400m Hurdles (Helsinki)
 1984 Women's Friendship Games 400m Hurdles (Prague)
 1986 Women's European Championships 400m Hurdles (Stuttgart)
 1987 Women's World Championships 400m Hurdles (Rome)
 1988 Women's Olympic 400m Hurdles (Seoul)

References

External links
  Results

 1
400 metres hurdles at the Olympics
1984 in women's athletics
Women's events at the 1984 Summer Olympics